The Double Tufted Royal Dacalana vidura is a species of blue butterfly found in South East Asia. It was described by Thomas Horsfield in 1857.

Range
The butterfly occurs in India from Assam eastwards and across to Dawnas and southern Myanmar. The range extends to Peninsular Malaysia, Sumatra and Java.

Taxonomy
The butterfly was previously classified as Pratapa vidura.

Status
Not Rare.

Cited references

See also
List of butterflies of India (Lycaenidae)

References
  
 
 
 
 

Dacalana
Butterflies of Asia